Ajmalicine, also known as δ-yohimbine or raubasine, is an antihypertensive drug used in the treatment of high blood pressure. It has been marketed under numerous brand names including Card-Lamuran, Circolene, Cristanyl, Duxil, Duxor, Hydroxysarpon, Iskedyl, Isosarpan, Isquebral, Lamuran, Melanex, Raunatin, Saltucin Co, Salvalion, and Sarpan. It is an alkaloid found naturally in various plants such as Rauvolfia spp., Catharanthus roseus, and Mitragyna speciosa.

Ajmalicine is structurally related to yohimbine, rauwolscine, and other yohimban derivatives. Like corynanthine, it acts as a α1-adrenergic receptor antagonist with preferential actions over α2-adrenergic receptors, underlying its hypotensive rather than hypertensive effects.

Additionally, it is a very strong inhibitor of the CYP2D6 liver enzyme, which is responsible for the breakdown of many drugs. Its binding affinity at this receptor is 3.30 nM.

See also
 Corynanthine
 Rauwolscine
 Spegatrine
 Yohimbine

References

Alkaloids found in Rauvolfia
Alpha-1 blockers
Antihypertensive agents
Quinolizidine alkaloids
Tryptamine alkaloids
Indoloquinolizines
Vinca alkaloids